Harákmbut–Katukinan is a proposal linking the South American indigenous language families Harákmbut and Katukinan. There is reasonably good evidence that the two are related. Jolkesky (2011) also adds Arawan to the family.

Family division
Harákmbut
Huachipaeri (also known as Huachipaire, Wacipaire)
Amarakaeri
Katukinan
Katukina-Kanamari (also known as Kanamarí) 
Katawixi (also known as Catawishi)
Arawan

Jolkesky (2011) concludes Arawan is closer to Harákmbut than to Katukinan.

Internal branching of the Arawá-Katukína-Harakmbet family according to Jolkesky (2011):

Language contact
Jolkesky (2016) notes that there are lexical similarities with Arawakan languages due to contact.

Vocabulary
The following table from Adelaar (2000) lists lexical cognates between Kanamari and Harákmbut:

{| class="wikitable sortable"
! no. !! Spanish gloss(original) !! English gloss(translated) !! Kanamarí !! Harakmbut
|-
| 1 || casa || house || hak || hák
|-
| 2 || diente || tooth || i || -id
|-
| 3 || pie || foot || i || -iʔ
|-
| 4 || nariz || nose || o(h) pak || -õh
|-
| 5 || cabeza || head || ki || -kɨ
|-
| 6 || río || river || wa(h) || -wɛ̃ʰ
|-
| 7 || huevo || egg || takarapu || po 'objeto redondo (round object)'
|-
| 8 || lengua || tongue || noko || nõʔ
|-
| 9 || mano || hand || ba || -ᵐba
|-
| 10 || hoja || leaf || hakba, taroba || eʔᵐba
|-
| 11 || estómago || stomach || ma || wa-mẽʔ 'hígado (liver)'
|-
| 12 || ojo || eye || iko || -kpo
|-
| 13 || sangre || blood || mimi || mĩmĩ
|-
| 14 || barriga || belly || min || -mĩn 'intestino (intestines)'
|-
| 15 || brazo || arm || pan || wa-ᵐbaʔagᵑ 'omóplato (shoulderbone)'
|-
| 16 || jaguar || jaguar || pida(h) || apetpet
|-
| 17 || nombre || name || wadik || -ⁿdik
|-
| 18 || dentro, en || inside, in || naki || wa-ẽk 'barriga (belly)'
|-
| 19 || yuca || yucca || tawa 'yuca (variedad dulce) (sweet variety of yuca)' || táᵊre
|-
| 20 || campo cultivado || cultivated field || bao(h) || [taʔ]ᵐba
|-
| 21 || negro || black || tik || sik-ⁿda
|-
| 22 || camino || road || dan || ⁿagᵑ
|-
| 23 || nuevo || new || (a)boawa || -ᵐbo-ⁿda
|-
| 24 || palo, árbol || stick, tree || o(h)man || wẽⁱmẽⁱ
|-
| 25 || carne || meat || barahai || áiʔ 'hueso (bone)'; -hẽn 'carne (meat)'
|-
| 26 || comer || eat || pu || pe
|-
| 27 || venir || come || dakdyi || e-tʃiak
|-
| 28 || defecar || defecate || dokna || ⁿdoʔ
|-
| 29 || llegar; ir || arrive; go || waokdyi 'llegar' || waʔ 'ir'
|-
| 30 || leña || firewood || i(h)ta || ɨtaʔ
|-
| 31 || tobillo || ankle || itakon || itak-pi 'espinilla (shin)' (Huachipairi)
|-
| 32 || nube || cloud || kodo'omi || kurudⁿ
|-
| 33 || cielo || sky || kodoh || kɨ'rɨdⁿ
|-
| 34 || viejo; finado || old; dead || kidak 'ser viejo (be old)' || kʉuⁿdak 'finado (dead)'
|-
| 35 || quebrar, romper || break || kuruk || ketek
|-
| 36 || venado || deer || ba(h)tyi || ᵐbáwiʰ
|-
| 37 || cargar || load || ik || yʉuk
|-
| 38 || piel || skin || dak || -síⁿdak
|-
| 39 || animal || animal || bara 'caza, animal (game, animal)' || aᵐbʉuredⁿ
|-
| 40 || hermano || brother || aponpia || pogᵑ 'hermano mayor de la mujer (elder brother of wife)'
|-
| 41 || padre || father || pama || áːpagᵑ
|-
| 42 || madre || mother || nyama || náŋʔ
|-
| 43 || cabello || hair || poi || -wih 'vello (body hair)'
|-
| 44 || cuerpo || body || boro || ᵐboroʔ 'grande (big)'
|-
| 45 || soplar || blow || po(h)po(h)[man] || po
|-
| 46 || dormir || sleep || kitan || táⁱʔ
|-
| 47 || niño || boy || opu 'hijo; pequeño (son; small)' || wa-ʂí-po
|-
| 48 || humo || smoke || omi || oʔsĩwĩ
|-
| 49 || hamaca || hammock || homo || horoʔɛʔ
|-
| 50 || volver || return || kinhina || korʉudⁿ
|-
| 51 || lluvia || rain || hin || ówiʔ
|-
| 52 || hermana (vocativo) || sister (vocative) || miyo || mĩŋʔ
|-
| 53 || testículos || testicles || pada kon || wãⁿda 'fruita redonda u oblonga (round or oblong fruit)'
|}

For a list of cognates sets by Jolkesky (2011), see the corresponding Portuguese article.

References

Indigenous languages of South America
Languages of Peru
Proposed language families